Metastelma is a genus of plant in the family Apocynaceae first described in 1810.

Species

formerly included

References

 
Apocynaceae genera
Taxonomy articles created by Polbot